CGP may refer to:
 Certified Geriatric Pharmacist, a professional certification from the Commission for Certification in Geriatric Pharmacy
Certified Group Psychotherapist (CGP), a professional certification from the International Board for Certification of Group Psychotherapists, American Group Psychotherapy Association (AGPA)
 CGP (books) (Coordination Group Publications), a textbook publishing company
 CGP Grey, a YouTuber and podcaster
 CGP Grey, a penguin at Bristol Zoo, named after the above
 Shah Amanat International Airport (IATA airport code: CGP) in Chittagong, Bangladesh
 Computervision Graphics Processor or CGP
Cartesian Genetic Programming, a form of genetic programming
 Canadian Grand Prix
 Certified Guitar Player or CGP, a fanciful title that Chet Atkins bestowed on his favorite guitarists
 C.G.P., an album by Chet Atkins
 cGP, Cyclic glycine-proline (cGP)